Aki Pekka Antero Sirkesalo (25 July 1962 – 26 December 2004) was a Finnish singer and broadcaster.

Career
Sirkesalo started his public career in 1984 as an announcer in the Finnish Broadcasting Company radio show Rockradio. In 1986, he formed a band called Giddyups and later a successful a cappella group Veeti and the Velvets. Sirkesalo released his first solo album Mielenrauhaa in 1995. He went on to make four more solo albums, the last of which, Sanasta miestä, was released posthumously in February 2005. Sirkesalo also hosted music-related TV shows for the Finnish Broadcasting Company.

Death
Sirkesalo, aged 42, and his family (wife Johanna, aged 38, son Sampo, aged 8 and daughter Saana, aged 4) drowned after being struck by the tsunami during their vacation in Khao Lak, Thailand, in 2004. They lie buried in Toijala. Before his death, Sirkesalo lived with his family for the last few years of his life in Klaukkala, Nurmijärvi.

Solo albums

References

1962 births
2004 deaths
20th-century Finnish male singers
Finnish television presenters
Finnish radio presenters
Finnish rock singers
Finnish composers
Finnish lyricists
Finnish guitarists
Deaths by drowning
Victims of the 2004 Indian Ocean earthquake and tsunami
Natural disaster deaths in Thailand
People from Akaa
Finnish music arrangers
21st-century Finnish male singers